<---> (alternative title Back and Forth) is a 1969 structural film by Canadian director Michael Snow. Shot in and outside a classroom at the Madison, New Jersey campus of Fairleigh Dickinson University, the camera pans and tilts with varying frequency.

Content

The first section shows a pan across a building’s exterior as a person walks into frame. A cut to a classroom interior shows a pan continuing the same movement along a fixed arc, both endpoints of which are signaled by the sound of the camera hitting a wooden stop arm. For most of this first section, the pans occur with the same frequency. Figures appear at various points in the field of view described by the pan’s arc (often on-camera, at one of the pan’s endpoints, but potentially also at any point in-between, either on- or off-camera). Three-quarters into this section, the pans begin to accelerate, until the image blurs.

The second section uses a tilt, which shows the room from floor to ceiling. Over this section’s duration, the tilts gradually decelerate.

A title card is shown, giving the shooting location, the names of people who appeared or were nearby, the equipment used, the names of the recording and processing facilities used, and the work’s distributor.

The final section superimposes previous pan and tilt sequences (some reversed or shown upside-down), intercut with black and white footage.

Production
A title card appearing in the film reads:

Cast
 Allan Kaprow
 Emmett Williams
 Max Neuhaus
 Joyce Wieland
 Luis Camnitzer

Reception
Manny Farber, writing in the January 1970 issue of Artforum, commented on the work's sculptural effects: "Basically it's a perpetual motion film that ingeniously builds a sculptural effect by insisting on time-motion to the point where the camera's swinging arcs and white wall field assume the hardness, the dimensions of a concrete beam." Farber went on to single out the soundtrack's use of percussion as a sculptural element: "In such a hard, drilling work, the wooden clap sounds are a terrific invention, and, as much as any single element, create the sculpture. Seeming to thrust the image outward off the screen, these clap effects are timed like a metronome, sometimes occurring with torrential frequency.”

Gene Youngblood, in the January 2–8, 1970, edition of the Los Angeles Free Press, regarded Back and Forth as an expansion of cinema's narrative parameters: ". . . in 'Back and Forth,' Snow was able to completely suffuse form with content, while not relinquishing the traditional elements of characterization and acting." Writing in The Monthly Film Bulletin, for September 1976, Jonathan Rosenbaum similarly addressed the film's use of characterization: "Although a man crosses the visual field in the opening shot, and people are glimpsed at intervals throughout, their presence comprises not the subject but the counterpoint of a physical process defined by the continual panning motion of the camera."

References

External links 
 
 The Film-Makers' Cooperative
 Canadian Filmmakers Distribution Centre

1969 films
1969 independent films
1960s English-language films
Canadian independent films
Films directed by Michael Snow
1960s Canadian films
Canadian avant-garde and experimental short films